Walter Piston's Serenata for Orchestra is an orchestral suite or miniature symphony written in 1956.

History
Piston composed the Serenata in 1956, on commission for the Louisville Orchestra, and is dedicated to conductor Robert Whitney, who led the work's premiere on October 25, 1956.

Analysis
The work is in three movements.

Con allegrezza
Con sentimento
Con spirito

The outer movements of the Serenata are in D major, and the overall form resembles a miniature symphony lasting only twelve minutes. This, the title, and certain melodic gestures make this composition more Mozartean than any of Piston's neoclassical works from the 1930s, though it remains further from 18th-century styles than neoclassical works of Poulenc, Prokofiev, or Stravinsky. The first movement is reminiscent of the Ballando ("dancing") movement of Piston's Fourth Symphony. The middle movement is dominated by a long-lined tune, and the work closes with a high-spirited, strutting finale. Tonal emphasis in the finale on the tonic minor, subdominant, and minor dominant lend an ambiguity to the D-major conclusion that is characteristic for Piston.

Discography
 Walter Piston: Serenata for Orchestra; David Van Vactor: Fantasia, Chaconne, and Allegro; Niels Viggo Bentzon: Pezzi sinfonici; Louisville Orchestra; Robert Whitney, cond. LP recording. Louisville Orchestra First Edition Records LOU-586. Louisville, Kentucky, 1958.
 Walter Piston: Symphony No. 4; Capriccio for Harp and String Orchestra; Serenata for Orchestra; Three New England Sketches. Therese Elder Wunrow, harp; Seattle Symphony; Gerard Schwarz. CD recording. Delos DE 3106. Hollywood, California: Delos International, 1991.

References
 

Footnotes

Further reading
Johnson, Bret. 1992. Record review: "Piston: Symphony No.4; Capriccio for Harp and Strings; Serenata; Three New England Sketches. Seattle Symphony, New York Chamber Symphony of the 92nd Street Y, c. Gerard Schwarz. Delos DE 3106. Harbison: Viola Concerto; Laderman: Concerto for Double Orchestra. Jaime Laredo (vla), New Jersey Symphony Orchestra, c. Hugh Wolff. New World 80404-2. Rorem: Eagles; Piano Concerto in Six Movements; Air Music. Jerome Lowenthal (pno), Louisville Orchestra c. Gerhardt Zimmerman, Jorge Mester, Peter Leonard. Albany Records TROY 047. Barber: Prayers of Kierkegaard, Op. 30; The Lovers, Op. 43. Sarah Reese (sop), Dale Duesing (bar), Chicago Symphony Orchestra and Chorus, c. Andrew Schenck. Koch International Classics 3-7125-2H1". Tempo, new series, no. 181 (June: Scandinavian Issue): 44–45.

External links
, Berkshire Symphony, Ronald Feldman conducting

Compositions by Walter Piston
1956 compositions
Orchestral suites
Music commissioned by the Louisville Orchestra
Music dedicated to ensembles or performers